Bohlmann is a German surname. Notable people with the surname include:

Frank Bohlmann (1917-1999), American footballer
Georg Bohlmann (1869–1928), German mathematician who specialized in probability theory and actuarial mathematics. 
Georg Carl Bohlmann (1838–1920), Danish composer and organist
Hans-Joachim Bohlmann (1937–2009), German property vandal
Ralph Arthur Bohlmann (born 1932), American theologian
Sabine Bohlmann (born 1969), German actress

See also
Theodor Bohlmann-Combrinck (1891–1956), German Wehrmacht general
Philip Bohlman (born 1952), American ethnomusicologist

German-language surnames